Pseudipocregyes is a genus of longhorn beetles of the subfamily Lamiinae, containing the following species:

 Pseudipocregyes albosignatus Breuning, 1974
 Pseudipocregyes fruhstorferi Breuning, 1968
 Pseudipocregyes maculatus Pic, 1923

References

Mesosini